Cindy Billaud (born 11 March 1986 in Nogent-sur-Marne) is a French athlete specialising in the 100 metres hurdles. Her biggest success to date is the seventh place at the 2013 World Championships in Moscow.

Billaud competed for France at the 2016 Summer Olympics.

She has personal bests of 12.56 seconds in the 100 metres hurdles (2014) and 7.87 seconds in the 60 metres hurdles (2014).

Competition record

National

Personal Bests

References

External links 
 
 
 
 
 
 

1986 births
Living people
French female hurdlers
Sportspeople from Nogent-sur-Marne
World Athletics Championships athletes for France
European Athletics Championships medalists
Athletes (track and field) at the 2016 Summer Olympics
Olympic athletes of France
21st-century French women